Pilar González i Duarte (born 1945) is a Spanish chemist. She is a member of the Institute for Catalan Studies (IEC). In 2004, she was the recipient of the Jaume Vicens i Vives distinction awarded by the Government of Catalonia.

Early life and education
Pilar González i Duarte was born in Barcelona, 1945. She studied chemistry at the University of Barcelona, where she graduated in 1967 with an Extraordinary Prize. She did a master's degree in chemistry at the University of Michigan, and a Ph.D. at the Autonomous University of Barcelona (UAB) with Enric Casassas i Simó, where she also obtained an Extraordinary Doctorate Award.

Career and research
In 1990, González i Duarte became a professor at UAB, where she has held several senior positions. She focused her initial research on metal thiol compounds, using aliphatic mercaptans, with results that have been of interest for industrial processes of petroleum hydrodesulfurization and in the field of bioinorganics, a field in which she has also carried out several investigations. She has collaborated with the Pergamon publishing house in the U.K. and has been a lecturer. In 2000, she curated a traveling exhibition inaugurated at mNACTEC, with the title  (Everything is chemistry).

Awards and honours
In 2004, González i Duarte, while a member of the Department of Chemistry at UAB, received the Jaume Vicens Vives distinction awarded by the Government of Catalonia for university teaching quality, in recognition of her career and dedication to the renovation and readaptation of chemistry teaching.

Selected works
 2005, Les Mil cares de la taula periòdica

References

1945 births
Living people
Scientists from Barcelona
Spanish chemists
University of Barcelona alumni
University of Michigan alumni
Autonomous University of Barcelona alumni